Ben Robertson may refer to:

 Ben Robertson (journalist) (1903–1943), American author, journalist and World War II war correspondent
 Ben Robertson (footballer) (born 1971), former Australian rules footballer
 Ben Robertson (actor) on Executive Stress
 Ben Robertson, co-author of autobiography of Domenico Cacciola